No Child Left Behind is the third and most recent studio album by American thrash metal band Viking. It was released on March 4, 2015, and is the band's first studio album in 26 years (since 1989's Man of Straw), and their first release with Justin Zych from Zephaniah on guitar and Mike Gonzalez from Dark Angel on bass. Viking did not have an official drummer when they began work on the album in 2011, but the drum studio tracks on this album were played by Gene Hoglan (also a member of Dark Angel).

Track listing

Personnel
 Ron Eriksen - Vocals, Guitar
 Justin Zych - Guitar
 Mike Gonzalez - Bass
 Gene Hoglan - Drums

References

2015 albums
Viking (band) albums